John Gumley (c. 1670 – 19 December 1728) was an English furniture-maker, army contractor and MP.

Life
Gumley was the eldest son of Peter Gumley, a cabinet maker, and Elizabeth Davis. In 1692 he married Susannah White, sister-in-law to Sir John Wittewrong, 3rd Baronet. By 1694 he was advertising "all sorts of cabinet work", but his most successful enterprises were in glass-making. In 1703 he supplied large mirrors to Chatsworth House, and in 1705 opened a glass-house at Lambeth. In 1712 his work was praised by Richard Steele in The Spectator.

Gumley and James Moore succeeded Gerrit Jensen as royal cabinet-makers in 1715, and in 1716 Pulteney appointed Gumley Deputy Commissioner of Musters. After unsuccessfully contesting Bramber (UK Parliament constituency) in 1722, he became MP for Steyning. In 1724 he was appointed Commissioner General of Musters. He built Gumley House in Isleworth which was left to his daughter Anna Maria. Retiring as an MP in 1727, he died 19 December 1728.

Family legacy

After Gumley's death his wife Susan Gumley continued the business.

He had three sons and four daughters. Gumley's daughter, Anna Maria married William Pulteney, the future Earl of Bath in 1714. Gumley's daughter Susanna married Christopher Lockman and died from childbirth complications upon delivering their son, Rev. Dr. John Lockman, Canon of Windsor. Gumley's daughter Mary married Francis Colman and their son George Colman was a playwright. Gumley's daughter Laetitia married Launcelot Charles Lake and their son Gerard was a general.

He plainly thought very little of his eldest son, George who was to all intents and purposes disinherited being given a stipend of £150 a year on condition that he did not get in contact with his mother. His other son, John succeeded him as a partner in the glass manufactory of Richard Hughes & Co. of Vauxhall and went out to India where he was first Chief of Dacca. His third son, Samuel was an army officer.

References

Further reading
 
 Bowett, 2002, English Furniture from Charles II to Queen Anne
 Bird, 2014, The Furniture and Furnishing of St James's Palace

1670 births
Year of birth uncertain
1728 deaths
British cabinetmakers
Glass makers
Members of the Parliament of Great Britain for English constituencies
British MPs 1722–1727